The 1951–52 league championship was cancelled due to the revolution of 1952 and to allow the national team to prepare for the 1952 Summer Olympics. However, the Egypt Cup and the Cairo League were played normally. Al Ahly lost both tournaments to Zamalek.

Competitions

Overview

Cairo Zone League 

Cairo league champion was decided by results of Cairo teams in national league with no separate matches for Cairo league competition.

Table

League table

 (C)= Champions, Pld = Matches played; W = Matches won; D = Matches drawn; L = Matches lost; F = Goals for; A = Goals against; Pts = Points Source: .

Matches

Egypt Cup

First round 

|}

Quarter-final 

|}

Semi-final 

|}

Final

References

Al Ahly SC seasons
Egyptian football clubs 1951–52 season
1951–52 in African association football leagues